The 1985–86 St. Louis Blues season saw the Blues finish in third place in the Norris Division with a record of 37 wins, 34 losses, and 9 ties for 83 points.  The Blues participated in the NHL playoffs, beating the Minnesota North Stars in the Norris Division Semi-finals, three games to two, followed by a 4–3 series win over the Toronto Maple Leafs to take the Norris Division playoff title. However, they lost to the Calgary Flames in the Campbell Conference Finals in seven games. The Blues won Game 6 of those Campbell Conference Finals in overtime, 6–5, a victory known to Blues fans as "The Monday Night Miracle".

Offseason

Regular season

Final standings

Schedule and results

Player statistics

Regular season
Scoring

Goaltending

Playoffs
Scoring

Goaltending

Playoffs

Awards and records

Draft picks
St. Louis's draft picks at the 1985 NHL Entry Draft held at the Metro Toronto Convention Centre in Toronto, Ontario.

References
 Blues on Hockey Database

St. Louis Blues seasons
St. Louis
St. Louis
St Louis
St Louis